20th Regiment may refer to:

Infantry regiments
 20th Infantry Regiment (United States)
 20th Regiment of Bengal Native Infantry, an East India Company unit
 20th Duke of Cambridge's Own Infantry (Brownlow's Punjabis), a British Indian Army unit
 20th Continental Regiment, a Continental Army unit
 20th Regiment of Foot, a British Army unit

American Civil War regiments

Union (Northern) regiment
 20th Connecticut Infantry Regiment
 20th Illinois Infantry Regiment
 20th Indiana Infantry Regiment
 20th Iowa Volunteer Infantry Regiment
 20th Kansas Militia Infantry Regiment
 20th Regiment Kentucky Volunteer Infantry
 20th Maine Volunteer Infantry Regiment
 20th Regiment Massachusetts Volunteer Infantry
 20th Michigan Volunteer Infantry Regiment
 20th New York Volunteer Infantry Regiment
 20th Pennsylvania Infantry
 20th Wisconsin Volunteer Infantry Regiment

Confederate (Southern) regiments
 20th Arkansas Infantry Regiment
 20th Tennessee Infantry Regiment
 20th Virginia Infantry

Other regiments
 20th Marine Regiment (United States)
 20th Field Artillery Regiment, RCA, Royal Canadian Artillery
 20th Field Artillery Regiment (United States)
 20th Hussars, a cavalry regiment of the British Army
 20th Lancers (Pakistan), an armoured regiment
 20th Light Dragoons, a cavalry regiment of the British Army
 20th Surveillance and Target Acquisition Regiment, Royal Australian Artillery